Audun Hultgreen Weltzien (born 3 September 1983) is a Norwegian orienteering competitor.

He competed at the 2009 World Orienteering Championships in Miskolc, where he placed 19th in the middle distance, and participated on the Norwegian relay team. In 2003 he won a silver medal in the relay at the Junior World Orienteering Championships.

He represents the club IL Tyrving. He is a son of Eystein Weltzien and the older brother of Ingunn Weltzien.

References

External links
 
 

1983 births
Living people
Sportspeople from Bærum
Norwegian male long-distance runners
Norwegian orienteers
Male orienteers
Foot orienteers
World Orienteering Championships medalists
21st-century Norwegian people
Junior World Orienteering Championships medalists